Simon Oxley (born 1969) is a British freelance graphic designer who is most famous for designing the original bird logo for Twitter, the Octocat logo for GitHub, a mascot for YEN, and the Cody mascot for Software.com. Oxley was a prolific contributor to the iStockphoto site, which he had joined because of a free promotional offer for purchasers of the Adobe Creative Suite. Both companies purchased Oxley's designs from the website (Twitter paid $10–15 for its logo, of which Oxley received $2–6) but the licence did not allow them to use the works as logos. Twitter's founders redesigned their logo in response, but GitHub asked Oxley for permission, which he granted. While the initial GitHub logo has gone on to develop into a more stylised form (the official "Invertocat" logo), GitHub developed Simon's original drawing into the Octocat logo and the character of "Mona Lisa the Octocat" which became a core part of their brand identity.

Simon credits Japanese popular art as an influence on his Twitter design and others, and said he was grateful for the wide distribution of his images despite receiving very little compensation.

References

External links
 

British graphic designers
Logo designers
1969 births
Living people
People from Basingstoke and Deane
People from Hampshire (before 1974)